Janaknandani (Nepali: जनकनन्दिनी) is a rural municipality in Danusha District in Province No. 2 of Nepal. It was formed in 2016 occupying current 6 sections (wards) from previous 6 VDCs. It occupies an area of 27.62 km2 with a total population of 25,085.

Villages and wards

References 

Populated places in Dhanusha District
Rural municipalities of Nepal established in 2017
Rural municipalities in Madhesh Province